New Standards is a studio album by a young John Pizzarelli attempting to create modern standards in the Great American Songbook. The release was not met with much enthusiasm, as most critics felt Pizzarelli was capable of much better offerings. Aside from his regular trio of himself, Martin Pizzarelli and Ray Kennedy, a host of other musicians join Pizzarelli on this album (including his father Bucky Pizzarelli).

Track listing 
Fools Fall In Love   
Oh How My Heart Beats For You     
Beautiful Moons Ago  
I'm Your Guy    
Come On-A My House     
Beautiful Maria Of My Soul  
I Only Want Some  
I'm Alright Now    
Just A Skosh  
Why Do People Fall In Love    
Hearts Like Mine Are Broken Every Day    
Better Run Before It's Spring    
Give Me Your Heart     
Look At Us    
Oh How My Heart Beats For You (Swing)

Personnel

Leading
John Pizzarellivocals, guitar
Martin Pizzarellidouble-bass, background vocals
Ray Kennedypiano, Hammond organ, background vocals

Guest credits
 Darmon Meadertenor saxophone, background vocals
 Ted Nashtenor saxophone
 Bucky Pizzarelliguitar
 Harvey Estrinflutes
 Glen EstrinFrench horn
 Joe Cocuzzodrums 
 Tony Corbiscellodrums
 Richard Centalonzabass clarinet, flutes, baritone saxophone
 Scott Robinsonclarinet, flutes, tenor saxophone
 Jack Stuckeyclarinet, flutes
 Jim Saporitovibraphone, other percussion
 Dick Liebmusical arrangement

References

1994 albums
John Pizzarelli albums
Novus Records albums
Albums produced by Brooks Arthur